Ilya Yuryevich Shkurenyov (born 11 January 1991) is a Russian decathlete. His personal best score is 8538 points, achieved at the 2015 IAAF World Championships in Beijing. He was second at IAAF World Junior Championships in 2010, 4th at IAAF World Indoor Championships 2012 in heptathlon.

Competition record

Personal bests

Outdoor
100 metres – 10.89 (+0.7 m/s, Smolensk 2017)
400 metres – 47.88 (Beijing 2015)
1500 metres – 4:24.98 (Beijing 2015)
110 metres hurdles – 13.95 (+1.4 m/s, Smolensk 2017)
High jump – 2.12 (Smolensk 2017)
Pole vault – 5.40 (Moscow 2013)
Long jump – 7.78 (Cheboksary 2016)
Shot put – 14.71 (Doha 2019)
Discus throw – 48.75 (Doha 2019)
Javelin throw – 63.58 (Zürich 2014)
Decathlon – 8601 (Smolensk 2017)

Indoor
60 metres – 6.98 (Prague 2015)
1000 metres – 2:41.65 (Volgograd 2013)
60 metres hurdles – 7.86 (Prague 2015)
High jump – 2.11 (Volgograd 2015)
Pole vault – 5.30 (Prague 2015)
Long jump – 7.78 (Prague 2015)
Shot put – 14.49 (Moscow 2015)
Heptathlon – 6353 (Prague 2015)

References

 

1991 births
Living people
Sportspeople from Volgograd
Russian decathletes
Russian male athletes
Olympic decathletes
Olympic athletes of Russia
Athletes (track and field) at the 2012 Summer Olympics
European Games competitors for Russia
Athletes (track and field) at the 2019 European Games
World Athletics Championships athletes for Russia
Authorised Neutral Athletes at the World Athletics Championships
European Athletics Championships medalists
European Athletics Indoor Championships winners
Russian Athletics Championships winners
Athletes (track and field) at the 2020 Summer Olympics